Säkylä is a municipality of Finland. The municipality is unilingually Finnish.

Säkylä is best known as the home of the Finnish Defence Forces' Porin Prikaati (Pori Brigade) and for the large and successful food industry.

Municipality of Köyliö was merged to Säkylä on 1 January 2016.

Economy
The biggest employers are the Säkylä garrison (Pori Brigade), Lännen Tehtaat Plc, Broilertalo Oy, the Municipality of Säkylä, the Intermunicipal Federation of Public Health, and Sucros Säkylä.

Nature
For its diversity of nature, Säkylä has a special position among Finnish municipalities. Säkylä's Lake Pyhäjärvi (Säkylän Pyhäjärvi), situated mainly in the area of Säkylä, is the biggest lake in southwestern Finland. It is renowned for its clean and clear water and big yields of fish, and the maintenance of its natural state is secured by the common efforts of the inhabitants, the municipality, and local industry. The ecology of the lake is sensitive to disturbances and therefore its condition is closely monitored, which is why Pyhäjärvi is one of the most studied lakes in Europe. Insects found nowhere else in Finland live on the Säkylänharju Ridge. The fauna and flora of the ridge include several other rare and threatened species.

Lake Pyhäjärvi is a versatile bird lake. During the year, practically all of the water and shore birds of the Finnish inland waters are found there. The nesting species include lake birds drawn to the barren shores and clear waters, as well as some demanding specialities of the best eutrophic bird bays.

Culture
Säkylä is the original home of the Antti farmstead, nowadays a museum object in the Seurasaari Open Air Museum in Helsinki. According to Traficom, Säkylä is the second most motorized municipality in Finland with 651 cars per thousand inhabitants.

The whitefish soup was named traditional dish of the Säkylä parish in the 1980s.

Notable people
 Wilho Laine (1875–1918)
 Emil Cedercreutz (1879–1949)
 Toivo Aalto-Setälä (1896–1977)
 Harri Eloranta (born 1963)
 Petteri Orpo (born 1969)
 Petteri Summanen (born 1969)

See also
 Yttilä, a village of Säkylä

References

External links

Municipality of Säkylä – Official website

 
Populated places established in 1869
1869 establishments in the Russian Empire
Populated lakeshore places in Finland